Andrew Robl (born September 27, 1986), is a former American professional poker player from Okemos, Michigan. Robl admits going broke several times before finding success.

As a teenager, Andrew Robl discovered poker by watching ESPN’s coverage of the World Series of Poker. He started playing the game with his friends – and in online cash games, even though being underaged at the time. During the summer between his senior year in high school and freshman year in college, he made between $70,000 and $80,000 playing online poker.

At the age of 21, he moved to Las Vegas to pursue a profession in poker.

In 2008, Andrew Robl appeared on season 4 on the classic poker TV show Poker After Dark on NBC.

In 2013, he won the Aussie Millions $100,000 Challenge for $1,055,699.

Robl infamously lost a televised $532,000 hand of poker to Toby Lewis after his quad nines lost to quad queens.

As of 2021, his total live tournament winnings exceed $5,800,000. That sum was accumulated by cashing in 35 different events over the course of 12 years.

References

External links 

 
 Andrew Robl Hendon Mob profile

American poker players
Living people
1986 births
People from Okemos, Michigan